The 1970 Rawlings Tennis Classic – Singles was an event of the 1970 Rawlings Tennis Classic men's tennis tournament that was played at the Dwight Davis Tennis Center in Forest Park in St. Louis, Missouri in the United States from May 26 through June 4, 1970. The draw comprised 20 players and eight were seeded. First-seeded Rod Laver won the singles title, defeating second-seeded Ken Rosewall in the final, 6–1, 6–4. The final was played indoor at the Washington University Field House due to bad weather. Roy Emerson won 6–4, 6–1 against Fred Stolle in a third-place playoff match.

Seeds

Draw

Finals

Top half

Bottom half

See also
 Laver–Rosewall rivalry

References

External links
 ITF tournament edition details

Tennis in Missouri
1970 in American tennis